Khosrow Beyg (also known as Khosrowbag, Khosrow Bak, and Khusrowi) is a village in Khosrow Beyk Rural District, Milajerd District, Komijan County, Markazi Province, Iran. At the 2006 census, its population was 1,914, in 468 families.

References 

Populated places in Komijan County